Aspidimorpha miliaris is a widespread Asian species of beetles belonging to the family Chrysomelidae. The genus name is frequently misspelled as "Aspidomorpha", due to an unjustified spelling change in 1848 .

Description
Larvae have a gregarious habit and feed on Ipomoea species, with potentially dangerous impact on crops.

Distribution

Aspidimorpha miliaris occurs throughout SE Asia and India.

References

External links
 Biol.uni

Cassidinae
Beetles described in 1775
Insects of India
Taxa named by Johan Christian Fabricius